In Miꞌkmaq folklore, a Jenu is a wild and cannibalistic hairy giant.

Jenua are comparable to the Wendigo of Anishinaabe and Cree mythology (and, to a lesser extent, Sasquatch).

References

Mi'kmaq
First Nations culture
Legendary creatures of the indigenous peoples of North America
Mythological anthropophages
Native American giants